Clive Greenbelt Trail is an  urban recreational trail in Clive, Iowa and forms part of the Central Iowa Trails network.  This very busy recreational trail runs through Polk and Dallas Counties in Iowa. It is a curvy, paved asphalt and concrete trail.

Route
The trail begins at 73rd Street and Walnut Creek at the Walmart in Windsor Heights. For the next , the trail travels between 1900 142nd Street (at Lakeview Drive) and Lions Park, which is near Eason Elementary School in Waukee. In western Clive, more trails are being developed north of Hickman Road. You are able to access many of the parks, libraries, and the aquatic center by way of these trails. There are mile markers and helpful route directions to help you on your way.

Some access points
Parking is available at
73rd Street at the Walmart parking lot
1400 86th Street - west side of 86th street
10490 Maddox Parkway (restrooms): west of 100th Street and south of 7 Flags Fitness & Racquet Club
1750 114th Street: Clive Aquatic Center, Clive City Hall, Clive Library
11900 Hickman Road: truck stop
3904 123rd Street: Campbell Recreation Area
15166 Wildwood Drive: Wildwood Park
1700 156th Street: Lions Park

Other access points include
(addresses are approximate, parking is either limited or not available)
7750 University Avenue
9250 Swanson Blvd
east of 100th Street near Play It Again Sports
10200 Lincoln Avenue
Rio Valley Park: 10450 Sunset Terrace or 1750 Rio Valley Drive
10500 Greenbelt Drive
10800 Lincoln Avenue
2000 114th Street
2103 128th Street at Walnut Creek Drive
Raccoon River Valley Trail link
13200 Lakeshore Drive
13200 Woodlands Parkway
1634 Country Club Blvd: south of the spillway for the Lake Country Club dam and across from the boat ramp
1900 142nd Street at Lakeview Drive
1910 149th Street at Woodcrest Drive and Lakeview Drive
600 Woodcrest Drive
605 SE Boone Drive at 156th Street: Eason Elementary School, Waukee

Connections to other trails

Waukee
West of Campbell Recreation Area in Clive, a  link connects this trail to Waukee and the  Raccoon River Valley Trail, which is part of the American Discovery Trail.

Additionally, Lions Park at 1700 156th Street in Clive links westward to the Waukee trails system.

West Des Moines
Southward along the eastside of 128th Street, this trail links to the West Des Moines trail system via the sidewalk along the eastside of 60th Street in West Des Moines.

Additionally, from Campbell Recreation Area, this trail links to the West Des Moines trail system via southward along 123rd Street in Clive and West Lakes Parkway in West Des Moines to the sidewalk along the southside of Westtown Parkway in West Des Moines.  This connection between the two trail systems has less traffic and is an easier climb.

Windsor Heights and Urbandale
At 73rd Street and Walnut Creek, this trail connects to the Windsor Heights trail system and a recreational trail north to the Urbandale trail system.

Northside of Little Walnut Creek in western Clive, westside of 156th Street, along 133rd Street, and westside of 100th Street provide connections to the Urbandale trail system.

Future connections from Clive to the Urbandale trails system will be along Douglas Parkway, 149th Street, 142nd Street, and westside of Little Walnut Creek near 128th Street.

Des Moines and Valley Junction in West Des Moines
East of 73rd Street, the Clive Greenbelt Trail is linked to the Des Moines trail system and Valley Junction in West Des Moines via Walmart and Colby Park in Windsor Heights.

See also
List of rail trails
Raccoon River Valley Trail

References

External links
Clive Parks and Recreation Website - City of Clive website
Clive Greenbelt Trail - Iowa Natural Heritage Foundation (INHF) website
Windsor Heights Comprehensive Sidewalk Project Map with existing Bike Trail - City of Windsor Heights website
Map of Urbandale Trails - City of Urbandale website
Map of West Des Moines Trails (printable) - City of West Des Moines website
Central Iowa Trail System
American Discovery Trail
 Raccoon River Valley Trail - INHF website
Raccoon River Valley Trail - Chuck Offenburger's website
RRVT - Mobile apps website
Central Iowa Trails Network - overview
Iowa Trails - overview INHF website
Statewide Bikemap 2015 - Iowa DOT website
Bike Iowa

Protected areas of Dallas County, Iowa
Protected areas of Polk County, Iowa
Hiking trails in Iowa